2nd Lt. Alfred M. Gorham (1920–2009) was a Tuskegee Airman from Waukesha, Wisconsin. He was the only Tuskegee Airman from Wisconsin, and he was a prisoner of war after his plane went down over Munich, Germany in World War II.

Military service

After joining the Army Air Force in 1942 Gorham became a pilot with the Tuskegee Airmen. He graduated from the Tuskegee University February 8, 1944.

He saw action over Budapest Hungary and shot down two German Focke-Wulf 190 Fighters on August 3, 1944.

In 1945 his P-51 had engine trouble over Munich, Germany and he bailed out. He was captured and held by the Germans until the end of the war.

Awards
Purple Heart
Prisoner of War Medal
Congressional Gold Medal awarded to Tuskegee Airmen in 2006

See also 

 Executive Order 9981
 List of Tuskegee Airmen
 List of Tuskegee Airmen Cadet Pilot Graduation Classes
 Military history of African Americans

Personal life
After graduating from Waukesha High School in 1938 Gorham was accepted to Carroll College. However he took a job as a precision tool grinder. He later enlisted in the army and eventually he was accepted to the Tuskegee Airmen.

References

Notes

External links
 Fly (2009 play about the 332d Fighter Group)
Tuskegee Airmen at Tuskegee University
 Tuskegee Airmen Archives at the University of California, Riverside Libraries.
 Tuskegee Airmen, Inc.
 Tuskegee Airmen National Historic Site (U.S. National Park Service) 
 Tuskegee Airmen National Museum

1920 births
2009 deaths
United States Army personnel of World War II
People from Tuskegee, Alabama
Tuskegee Airmen
Tuskegee University alumni
Military personnel from Tuskegee, Alabama
Military personnel from Wisconsin
People from Waukesha, Wisconsin
Congressional Gold Medal recipients
United States Air Force officers
United States Army Air Forces pilots of World War II
Carroll University alumni
21st-century African-American people